Einstein and Religion: Physics and Theology (1999) is a book on the religious views of Nobel prize-winning physicist Albert Einstein by Max Jammer, published by Princeton University Press.

Contents
The book includes acknowledgments, an introduction, three chapters, an appendix, and an index. Chapter one is "Einstein's Religiosity and the Role of Religion in His Private Life".  Chapter two is named "Einstein's Philosophy of Religion", and chapter three is "Einstein's Physics and Theology".

The introduction
Jammer explains that no biographers have written about the important role of "religious sentiments and theological reflections" in Einstein's life, apart from "occasional references to his early religiosity." Jammer goes on to show that Einstein's scientific work and some of his more personal views have been welcomed by devout, orthodox theologians in all three of the major monotheistic religions: Islam, Christianity, and Judaism.  Jammer notes that "extensive use" of  "quotations from [sources]" will be used to prevent his own personal biases from creeping into the book.  Jammer also notes that although chapter three reflects the opinions of "prominent theologians and scientists", Einstein himself may well have rejected all arguments based upon them.  The introduction extends from pages 3 to 11.

Chapter one

Chapter one of the book begins by quoting and comparing three biographical accounts—Einstein's own, that of Maja Winterler-Einstein, and that of Alexander Moszkowski—of Einstein's early religiosity. By all accounts, for three years young Einstein attended a Roman Catholic elementary school. Next, the chapter explores the evidence of whether Einstein's indifference to religious affiliations his refusal to be bar mitzvahed or his first marriage to Mileva Maric, a member of the Greek Orthodox Church) is symptomatic of a defiance to authority—others claim this to be not only so but also a necessary prerequisite to his scientific achievements.  Whatever "'hidden complexities'" or "'groping constructive attempts'" might have been necessary for Einstein's watershed physical theories, Jammer concludes that such matters could not have been sociological or political as claimed by Feuer, but could have only involved Einstein's philosophy of religion.
David Hilbert's statement "'Do you know why Einstein said the most original and profound things about space and time that have been said in our generation? Because he had learned nothing about all the philosophy and mathematics of time and space." contradicts several of Einstein's own statements regarding the influence of the empiricism of David Hume and Ernst Mach upon his early work in relativity.  Jammer suggests this statement is even more improbable given that Einstein is reported to have read Kant's Critique of Pure Reason, which must have been when he was a teenager. By 1920, Jammer states that Baruch Spinoza had become Einstein's most admired philosopher.

Chapter two

It is about his personal beliefs.

Chapter three

Notes

References
Playing dice with Einstein: Essay review of Einstein and Religion, Michael D. Gordin (Society of Fellows, Harvard University, Cambridge, USA), Studies in History and Philosophy of Modern Physics volume 33 year 2002 pp. 95–100.
Einstein and Religion, Book Reviews, Gerald Holton, Philosophy of Science. Vol. 67, No. 3, (Sep., 2000), pp. 530–533.

External links
Book preview of Einstein and Religion at Google Books

1999 non-fiction books
American biographies
Books about Albert Einstein
German biographies